Brian Taylor may refer to:

Sportsmen
Brian Taylor (Australian footballer) (born 1962), Australian rules footballer
Brian Taylor (basketball) (born 1951), American basketball player
Brian Taylor (cricketer) (1932–2017), English cricketer
Brian Taylor (jockey) (1939–1984), English jockey
Brian Taylor (decathlete), British athlete at the 1996 AAA Championships

Football
Brian Taylor (footballer, born 1931), English footballer
Brian Taylor (footballer, born 1937), English footballer of the 1950s and 1960s whose clubs included Walsall, Birmingham City and Shrewsbury
Brian Taylor (footballer, born 1942), English footballer
Brian Taylor (footballer, born 1944), English footballer
Brian Taylor (footballer, born 1949), English football winger/full-back of the 1970s and 1980s whose clubs included Walsall and Preston North End
Brian Taylor (footballer, born 1954), English football defender of the 1970s and 1980s who played for Doncaster Rovers and Rochdale

Other disciplines
Brian Taylor (journalist) (born 1955), Scottish journalist
Brian Taylor (filmmaker), director of Crank: High Voltage
Brian Taylor (politician), former leader of British Columbia Marijuana Party and Mayor of Grand Forks, British Columbia

See also
Bryan Taylor (disambiguation)
Brien Taylor (born 1971), American baseball player
Brian Hope-Taylor (1923–2001), British historian and television presenter
Brian Shawe-Taylor (1915–1999), British racing driver